Kosmos 2522 ( meaning Space 2522) is a  Russian military satellite launched in 2017 as part of the GLONASS satellite navigation system.

This satellite is a GLONASS-M satellite, also known as Uragan-M, and is numbered Uragan-M No. 752.

Kosmos 2522 was launched from Site 43/4  at Plesetsk Cosmodrome in northern Russia. A Soyuz-2-1b carrier rocket with a Fregat upper stage was used to perform the launch which took place at 00:02 UTC on 22 September 2017. The launch successfully placed the satellite into a Medium Earth orbit. It subsequently received its Kosmos designation, and the international designator 2017-055A. The United States Space Command assigned it the Satellite Catalog Number 42939.

The satellite is in orbital plane 2, in orbital slot 14. As of March 2018 it remains in operation.

See also

 2017 in spaceflight
 List of Kosmos satellites (2501–2750)
 List of R-7 launches (2015–19)

References

Spacecraft launched in 2017
Spacecraft launched by Soyuz rockets
Kosmos satellites
2017 in Russia
GLONASS satellites